There are 363 men's college basketball programs competing in the National Collegiate Athletic Association's Division I. Each program employs a head coach. As of the 2023–24 season, the longest-tenured head coach is expected to be Greg Kampe, who has been head coach at Oakland since 1984.

Conference affiliations reflect those of the upcoming 2022–23 college basketball season.

See also
 List of current NCAA Division I baseball coaches
 List of current NCAA Division I FBS football coaches
 List of current NCAA Division I FCS football coaches
 List of current NCAA Division I women's basketball coaches
 List of current NCAA Division I men's ice hockey coaches
 List of NCAA Division I men's soccer coaches

Notes

References

Basketball coaches, men's